The Organized Socialist Party in Venezuela (PSOEV) is a Venezuelan democratic socialist political party. It was founded and legalized in 2006 and formally registered before the National Electoral Council (CNE) on July 11 of the same year by its directors Alejandro Moncada, Edgar Gómez, Faride Hobacay, Carlos Córdoba and Raúl León.

It was inspired by the Spanish Socialist Workers' Party (PSOE), although there is no direct political links between the two parties. It is a critical and vanguard party that seeks to deepen and contribute to the construction of socialism in Venezuela.

External links
Facebook page

2006 establishments in Venezuela
Bolivarian Revolution
Political parties established in 2006
Political parties in Venezuela
Socialist parties in Venezuela